The Castleblayney, Keady and Armagh Railway (CK&A) was an Irish gauge  railway in Ulster. The Armagh –  section was opened in 1909 and closed in 1957. The Castleblayney – Keady section was opened in 1910 and closed in 1924.

History
In 1899 a Bill was presented to Parliament to build a railway linking  on the Midland Great Western Railway (MGW) with Armagh on the Great Northern Railway (GNR). It was defeated.

The next year Parliament passed an Act to incorporate the Kingscourt, Keady and Armagh Railway Company, but the new company was unable to begin construction. Instead it reached agreement with the GNR to build the  section between Castleblayney and Armagh, and abandoned the planned section between Castleblayney and Kingscourt. A new bill in 1902 reincorporated it as the Castleblayney, Keady and Armagh Railway Company.

The  section between Castleblayney and Keady was opened on 11 November 1910, and the GNR (which was working the line) took over the company on 1 June 1911. The line attracted some freight but passenger traffic was light. Some passenger services were worked by a push–pull train formed of a single coach worked by a locomotive such as a BT class 4-4-0T dating from the 1880s. Freight trains were commonly worked by UG class 0-6-0s.

In 1957 the Government of Northern Ireland made the GNR close much of its remaining network in Northern Ireland, including goods traffic from the remaining section of the CKA  from 1 October 1957.

Features

The –long Tassagh Viaduct, north of Keady, is a composite. Its spandrels and parapets are stone, but its piers are reinforced concrete and the piers and the undersides of its 11 arches are faced with brick. This is a substantial saving in weight and construction compared with earlier purely stone or brick viaducts. The viaduct over the Callan River at Ballyards, by contrast, is faced entirely with stone.

References

Sources

Closed railways in Northern Ireland
Closed railways in Ireland
Defunct railway companies of Ireland
Great Northern Railway (Ireland)
Irish gauge railways
Railway lines closed in 1924
Railway lines closed in 1957
Railway lines opened in 1909
Railway lines opened in 1910
Transport in County Armagh
Transport in County Monaghan